Alice Playten (née Plotkin; August 28, 1947 – June 25, 2011) was an American actress known for her high-pitched, child-like voice.

Life and career
Born in New York City, Playten began her career at age 11 in the Broadway musical Gypsy (1959). Her other Broadway credits included Oliver!, Henry, Sweet Henry, Hello, Dolly!, Rumors, Seussical, and Caroline, or Change.

Her many off-Broadway credits include Promenade, The Last Sweet Days of Isaac, Up from Paradise, Sister Mary Ignatius Explains It All for You, First Lady Suite, A Flea in Her Ear, National Lampoon's Lemmings, and Shlemiel the First.

Playten's screen credits include Ladybug Ladybug (1963), Who Killed Mary What's 'Er Name? (1971), California Dreaming (1979), Legend (1985), and I.Q. (1994). She wore heavy makeup and prosthetics in Legend to portray the character of Blix, a major minion of the Lord of Darkness; she also dubbed the voice of Gump. She did voice work in several animated features, including Felix the Cat (as Pearl), Really Rosie (as an alligator), Heavy Metal (as Gloria), Doug (as Beebe Bluff and Elmo), Doug's 1st Movie and My Little Pony: The Movie.

She was a regular on the children's television series The Lost Saucer and That's Cat, appeared in National Lampoon's Disco Beaver from Outer Space during the early days of HBO, and had guest shots on Frasier, Law & Order, Third Watch, and As the World Turns, among others.

She performed a romantic dialog with Rupert Holmes in his song "Our National Pastime" on his 1974 debut album Widescreen.

Playten may have been best known for her role of the newlywed who makes a gigantic dumpling as the first meal she cooks for her husband (Terry Kiser) in two classic 1969–1970 Alka-Seltzer commercials.

In 1977, she wed the psychedelic light show innovator, director and artist Joshua White and remained married until her death.

Death
Playten died on June 25, 2011, at Sloan-Kettering Hospital in Manhattan from heart failure after a lifetime of juvenile diabetes, complicated by pancreatic cancer. On November 14, 2011, a retrospective of her work was held at the Second Stage Theater, New York.

Filmography

Film

Television

Awards and honors
 1968 Tony Award nomination for Best Featured Actress in a Musical (Henry, Sweet Henry)
 1968 Theatre World Award (Henry, Sweet Henry)
 1973 Obie Award for Distinguished Performance (National Lampoon's Lemmings)
 1989 Drama Desk Award nomination for Outstanding Featured Actress in a Play (Spoils of War)
 1994 Obie Award (First Lady Suite)

References

External links

Alice Playten Passes Away at 63

1947 births
2011 deaths
American film actresses
American musical theatre actresses
American soap opera actresses
American stage actresses
American television actresses
American voice actresses
Actresses from New York City
Obie Award recipients
Deaths from pancreatic cancer
Deaths from cancer in New York (state)
20th-century American actresses
21st-century American actresses